Wat Mangkon station is a Bangkok MRT rapid transit station on the Blue Line, regarded as one of four most beautiful MRT stations (consisted of Itsaraphap station, Sanam Chai station, Sam Yot station, and Wat Mangkon station).

Location
The station is situated right in the middle of the business district of the Chinese-Thais (otherwise known as Bangkok's Chinatown), along with Charoen Krung Road in the vicinity of Plaeng Nam Intersection, and close to Wat Mangkon Kamalawat (otherwise known as Wat Mangkon, or Leng Noei Yi, according to the Teochew dialect), which is a district of unique community culture tied to the history of the Chinese descendants.

It is overlaps between Samphanthawong Subdistrict, Samphanthawong District with Pom Prap Subdistrict, Pom Prap Sattru Phai District, Bangkok.

In addition to being close to Wat Mangkon Kamalawat, the station is also situated near the Mo Mi Junction, Trok Texas, Odeon Circle, Phlapphla Chai Police Station, Poh Teck Tung Foundation, 22 July Circle, and the New Yaowarat Market etc.

Design
Inside station is designed with Sino-Portuguese architecture in mind in order drawn from Wat Mangkon Kamalawat, the interior is decorated with murals of Chinese dragons and water lilies, and to correspond with the name of the station (Wat Mangkon Kamalawat meaning "Temple of Water Lily Dragon"); the ceiling along the descent into head residing inside the station. These were done through the use of red and gold colours, which are all colours of   auspiciousness according to Chinese beliefs.

The station is part of Nescafe Blend and Brew's Interactive Art Station Program in commemoration of its 46 years of business in Thailand.

Gallery

References 

MRT (Bangkok) stations
2019 establishments in Thailand
Railway stations opened in 2019